Joséphine Jobert (born 24 April 1985) is a French actress and singer, best known for playing Detective Sergeant Florence Cassell in the BBC One series Death in Paradise.

Biography
Jobert was born in Paris to a French family, the daughter of Véronique Mucret Rouveyrollis, a photographer, musician, writer, actress, and director, and Charles Jobert, a camera operator and director of photography. Her father is from a Sephardic Jewish and Pied-Noir family from Algeria, and her mother's ancestry is Martiniquaise, Spanish and Chinese. Jobert comes from a family of performing artists, which includes her paternal aunt Marlène Jobert and cousins Eva Green and Elsa Lunghini. 
In 1997, aged 12, she moved with her parents to Montreal, Quebec, Canada, for eight years, where she studied singing and acting, and took her first steps into television. With her friends and her parents, she participated in the creation of songs, videos, a web series, and a television series on the internet. She attended drama workshops by Stéphane Belugou as well as Coda Music School.

Career
From 2008 to 2014, Jobert had steady work in various French television series. She took on her first English-language role as Detective Sergeant Florence Cassell in the BBC One series Death in Paradise at the beginning of its fourth season in 2015. She left the show for "personal and professional reasons" after episode six of the eighth season in 2019, but returned for the tenth season in 2021. She is also in the 11th season and made her final appearance on the fourth episode of that series.

Filmography

Television
 2007–2009 : Our pension years : Amel Habib (seasons 1-3)
  2007–2011 : Lightning : Alice Watson
  2010 : My friends, my loves, my shit ... : Lou, a mechanic (Episode 2.06: All fire and flame)
 2012 : I was your age from Bruno Garcia : Yasmine
  2013 : Alice Nevers: The judge is a woman : Djamila (Episode 11.06: Amazon)
  2013–2014 : Under the sun of Saint-Tropez : Roxanne
  2013–2014 : Cut! : Victory Vila
  2014–ongoing: Villa Karayib : Kannelle Benneteau Meadow
 2015–2019, 2021–2022: Death in Paradise :  Detective Sergeant Florence Cassell (series 4–8 and 10–11)

Film
 2012 : Love Survey of Véronique Mucret Rouveyrollis Jo
 2013 : Words of Véronique Mucret Rouveyrollis : Esmeralda/Film-maker

Video
 2003 : Big Star Patrick Marty
 2007 : For the life, single from the album Our pension years

Albums
 2007 : Our pension years (soundtrack to the first season of the series namesake)
 2008 : Our board 2 years (soundtrack of the second season)
 2009 : Our pension 3 years (soundtrack to the third season)

References

External links

official twitter page

1985 births
Living people
Actresses from Paris
French people of Algerian-Jewish descent
French television actresses
21st-century French actresses
French people of Chinese descent
French expatriates in Canada
French people of Martiniquais descent
French people of Spanish descent
French Sephardi Jews
Mizrahi Jews